Silene parryi is a species of plant in the family Caryophyllaceae known by the common name Parry's silene. Its range includes southern British Columbia and Alberta, Canada, south to Oregon and east to Colorado and western Montana, United States. It is most common from  elevation. It inflates in fruit. The five-lobed flowers are white, sometimes purple or green-tinged.

References

Further reading
Roskov Y., Kunze T., Orrell T., Abucay L., Paglinawan L., Culham A., Bailly N., Kirk P., Bourgoin T., Baillargeon G., Decock W., De Wever A., Didžiulis V. (ed) (2014). Species 2000 & ITIS Catalogue of Life: 2014 Annual Checklist.. Species 2000: Reading, UK.. Retrieved 26 May 2014.

parryi